Gregor Volz Gillespie (born March 18, 1987) is an American professional mixed martial artist and graduated collegiate wrestler who currently competes in the lightweight division of the Ultimate Fighting Championship (UFC). A professional since 2012, he formerly competed for Ring of Combat where he was the Lightweight Champion.

As a folkstyle wrestler, Gillespie was the 2007 NCAA Division I National Champion at 149 pounds, a four–time NCAA Division I All–American and a three–time EWL and PSAC conference champion for the Edinboro Fighting Scots. He also competed briefly in freestyle wrestling.

Background 
Born and raised in Webster, New York, Gillespie attended Webster Schroeder High School where he was a standout in wrestling, winning two state titles. He continued wrestling for Edinboro University, where he was a four-time NCAA Division I All-American and won a national championship in 2007. He was the first true freshman All-American in school history, and also holds the school record for most career wins (152), most wins as a freshman (40), and highest winning percentage (.917). Gillespie stated that he ended his wrestling career because he didn't think he could beat Jordan Burroughs. He graduated from Edinboro with a bachelor's degree in individualized studies and a concentration in psychology. He was an assistant coach at Hofstra University and as a side gig, taught private lessons to an MMA fighter. Despite having vowed never to fight, he started studying MMA and quit his job in order to pursue a full-time career in the sport.

Mixed martial arts

Early career 
In 2012, Gillespie was scheduled to make his mixed martial arts debut but suffered a broken arm during a sparring session which caused serious health issues and infections, pushing his debut over to January 2014. After compiling an undefeated 7–0 record with six finishes on the regional scene in New Jersey, Gillespie signed a contract with the Ultimate Fighting Championship.

Ultimate Fighting Championship 
Gillespie made his promotional debut against Glaico Franca on September 24, 2016, at UFC Fight Night 95. He won the fight via unanimous decision.

Gillespie next faced Andrew Holbrook on April 8, 2017, at UFC 210. He won the fight via knockout in the first round and was awarded a Performance of the Night bonus.

Gillespie faced Jason Gonzalez on September 16, 2017, at UFC Fight Night 116. He won the back-and-forth fight via submission in the second round. The win also earned Gillespie his first Fight of the Night bonus award.

Gillespie faced Jordan Rinaldi on January 27, 2018, at UFC on Fox: Jacaré vs. Brunson 2. He won the fight via technical knock out.

Gillespie faced Vinc Pichel on June 1, 2018, at UFC Fight Night 131. Gillespie won via arm-triangle choke in the second round.  This win earned him Performance of the Night award.

Gillespie faced Yancy Medeiros on January 19, 2019, at UFC Fight Night: Cejudo vs. Dillashaw. He won the fight via TKO in the second round.

Gillespie faced Kevin Lee on November 2, 2019, at UFC 244.  He lost the fight via knockout in round one, marking his first professional defeat. 

Gillespie was expected to face Brad Riddell on March 20, 2021, at UFC on ESPN 21.  However, the bout was cancelled due to COVID-19 protocols in the day of the event. Instead, Gillespie faced No-Gi Jiu Jitsu World medalist Carlos Diego Ferreira on May 8, 2021, at UFC on ESPN 24.  At the weigh–ins, Ferreira weighed in at 160.5 pounds, four and a half pounds over the lightweight non-title fight limit and was fined 30% of his purse, which went to Gillespie. After a back-and-forth first round, where Gillespie appeared to fatigue, he was able to keep composure and rallied, winning the fight via TKO in round two. This fight earned him the Fight of the Night award.

Championships and accomplishments

Folkstyle wrestling
National Collegiate Athletic Association
NCAA Division I 149 lbs - 7th place out of Edinboro University (2006)
NCAA Division I 149 lbs - 1st place out of Edinboro University (2007)
NCAA Division I 157 lbs - 5th place out of Edinboro University (2008)
NCAA Division I 157 lbs - 4th place out of Edinboro University (2009)

Mixed martial arts
Ring of Combat
ROC Regional Lightweight Championship (One time)

Ultimate Fighting Championship
Fight of the Night (Two times) 
Performance of the Night (Two times)  vs.  Andrew Holbrook and Vinc Pichel

Mixed martial arts record

|-
|Win
|align=center|14–1
|Carlos Diego Ferreira
|TKO (elbows and punches)
|UFC on ESPN: Rodriguez vs. Waterson
|
|align=center|2
|align=center|4:51
|Las Vegas, Nevada, United States
|
|-
|Loss
|align=center|13–1
|Kevin Lee
||KO (head kick)
|UFC 244 
|
|align=center|1
|align=center|2:47
|New York City, New York, United States
|
|-
|Win
|align=center|13–0
|Yancy Medeiros
|TKO (punches)
|UFC Fight Night: Cejudo vs. Dillashaw 
|
|align=center|2
|align=center|4:59
|Brooklyn, New York, United States
|
|- 
|Win
|align=center|12–0
|Vinc Pichel
|Submission (arm-triangle choke)
|UFC Fight Night: Rivera vs. Moraes
|
|align=center|2
|align=center|4:06
|Utica, New York, United States
|
|-
|Win
|align=center|11–0
|Jordan Rinaldi
|TKO (punches)
|UFC on Fox: Jacaré vs. Brunson 2 
|
|align=center|1
|align=center|4:46
|Charlotte, North Carolina, United States
|
|-
|Win
|align=center|10–0
|Jason Gonzalez
|Submission (arm-triangle choke)
|UFC Fight Night: Rockhold vs. Branch 
|
|align=center|2
|align=center|2:10
|Pittsburgh, Pennsylvania, United States
|
|-
|Win
|align=center|9–0
|Andrew Holbrook
|KO (punches)
|UFC 210
|
|align=center|1
|align=center|0:21
|Buffalo, New York, United States
|
|-
| Win
| align=center| 8–0
| Glaico França
| Decision (unanimous)
| UFC Fight Night: Cyborg vs. Lansberg
| 
| align=center|3
| align=center|5:00
| Brasília, Brazil
|
|-
| Win
| align=center| 7–0
| Sidney Outlaw
| Decision (split) 
| Ring of Combat 55
| 
| align=center|3
| align=center|5:00 
| Atlantic City, New Jersey, United States
|
|-
| Win
| align=center| 6–0
| Jose Mariscal 
| TKO (punches) 
| Ring of Combat 54 
| 
| align=center|1
| align=center|4:09 
| Atlantic City, New Jersey, United States
|
|-
| Win
| align=center| 5–0
| George Sheppard 
| Submission (arm-triangle choke)
| Ring of Combat 51 
| 
| align=center|1
| align=center|3:45
| Atlantic City, New Jersey, United States
|
|-
| Win
| align=center| 4–0
| Justin Stewart
| TKO (punches) 
| Ring of Combat 50
| 
| align=center|1
| align=center|2:51
| Atlantic City, New Jersey, United States
|
|-
| Win
| align=center| 3–0
| Justin Harrington
| Submission (arm-triangle choke)
| Ring of Combat 49
| 
| align=center|1
| align=center|3:21
| Atlantic City, New Jersey, United States
|
|-
| Win
| align=center| 2–0
| Brandon Priest
| Submission (rear-naked choke)
| Ring of Combat 48
| 
| align=center|2
| align=center|2:37
| Atlantic City, New Jersey, United States
|
|-
| Win
| align=center| 1–0
| Kenny Gaudreau
| TKO (punches)
| Ring of Combat 47
| 
| align=center|1
| align=center|1:48
| Atlantic City, New Jersey, United States
|

NCAA record

! colspan="8"| NCAA Championships Matches
|-
!  Res.
!  Record
!  Opponent
!  Score
!  Date
!  Event
|-
! style=background:white colspan=6 |2009 NCAA Championships 4th at 157 lbs
|-
|Loss
|19–6
|align=left|Jordan Leen
|style="font-size:88%"|0–4
|style="font-size:88%" rowspan=6|March 19–21, 2009
|style="font-size:88%" rowspan=6|2009 NCAA Division I Wrestling Championships
|-
|Win
|19–5
|align=left|Michael Chandler
|style="font-size:88%"|MD 10–2
|-
|Loss
|18–5
|align=left|Jordan Burroughs
|style="font-size:88%"|MD 4–12
|-
|Win
|18–4
|align=left|J.P O’Connor
|style="font-size:88%"|1–0
|-
|Win
|17–4
|align=left|Jason Welch
|style="font-size:88%"|3–2
|-
|Win
|16–4
|align=left|Shane Smith
|style="font-size:88%"|TF 16–0
|-
! style=background:white colspan=6 |2008 NCAA Championships 5th at 157 lbs
|-
|Win
|15–4
|align=left|Josh Zupancic
|style="font-size:88%"|TF 15–0
|style="font-size:88%" rowspan=7|March 20–22, 2008
|style="font-size:88%" rowspan=7|2008 NCAA Division I Wrestling Championships
|-
|Loss
|14–4
|align=left|Dan Vallimont
|style="font-size:88%"|1–2
|-
|Win
|14–3
|align=left|Cyler Sanderson
|style="font-size:88%"|Fall
|-
|Win
|13–3
|align=left|Matt Kocher
|style="font-size:88%"|1–0
|-
|Loss
|12–3
|align=left|Jordan Leen
|style="font-size:88%"|6–8
|-
|Win
|12–2
|align=left|Jason Johnstone
|style="font-size:88%"|6–0
|-
|Win
|11–2
|align=left|Spencer Maley
|style="font-size:88%"|TF 17–0
|-
! style=background:white colspan=6 |2007 NCAA Championships  at 149 lbs
|-
|Win
|10–2
|align=left|Josh Churella
|style="font-size:88%"|SV 3–1
|style="font-size:88%" rowspan=5|March 15–17, 2007
|style="font-size:88%" rowspan=5|2007 NCAA Division I Wrestling Championships
|-
|Win
|9–2
|align=left|Dustin Schlatter
|style="font-size:88%"|3–2
|-
|Win
|8–2
|align=left|Jordan Leen
|style="font-size:88%"|6–2
|-
|Win
|7–2
|align=left|Dan Vallimont
|style="font-size:88%"|MD 10–2
|-
|Win
|6–2
|align=left|Sam Alvarenga
|style="font-size:88%"|9–5
|-
! style=background:white colspan=6 |2006 NCAA Championships 7th at 149 lbs
|-
|Win
|5–2
|align=left|Mark DiSalvo
|style="font-size:88%"|Fall
|style="font-size:88%" rowspan=7|March 16–18, 2006
|style="font-size:88%" rowspan=7|2006 NCAA Division I Wrestling Championships
|-
|Loss
|4–2
|align=left|Jon Masa
|style="font-size:88%"|4–11
|-
|Win
|3–1
|align=left|Patrick Simpson
|style="font-size:88%"|8–1
|-
|Loss
|2–1
|align=left|Ty Eustice
|style="font-size:88%"|4–2
|-
|Win
|2–0
|align=left|Keith Dickey
|style="font-size:88%"|Fall
|-
|Win
|1–0
|align=left|Trevor Chinn
|style="font-size:88%"|Fall
|-

Stats 

!  Season
!  Year
!  School
!  Placement
!  Weigh Class
!  Record
!  Win
|-
|2009
|Senior
|rowspan=4|Edinboro University of Pennsylvania
|4th
|rowspan=2|157
|41–3
|93.18%
|-
|2008
|Junior
|5th
|37–4
|90.24%
|-
|2007
|Sophomore
|1st
|rowspan=2|149
|34–2
|94.44%
|-
|2006
|Freshman
|7th
|40–4
|90.91%
|-
|colspan=5 bgcolor="LIGHTGREY"|Career
|bgcolor="LIGHTGREY"|152–13
|bgcolor="LIGHTGREY"|92.12%

See also
 List of current UFC fighters
 List of male mixed martial artists

References

External links
 
 

1987 births
Living people
American male mixed martial artists
Mixed martial artists from New York (state)
People from Webster, New York
Lightweight mixed martial artists
Mixed martial artists utilizing collegiate wrestling
Mixed martial artists utilizing freestyle wrestling
Mixed martial artists utilizing Brazilian jiu-jitsu
Ultimate Fighting Championship male fighters
American practitioners of Brazilian jiu-jitsu